Michael Kurylo, better known as Bunny FuFuu, is an American League of Legends player who is currently a streamer for Cloud9 and who most recently played substitute support for Cloud9 of the North American League of Legends Championship Series (NA LCS). He joined C9 on November 18, 2015. On July 17, 2016, Bunny FuFuu announced that he would be stepping down from C9's roster in order to become a full-time streamer.

Tournament results
===Curse Academy===
 3rd — 2014 NA Challenger Series Summer #1	
 2nd — 2014 NA Challenger Series Summer Playoffs	
 2nd — 2014 NA Challenger Series Summer Playoffs

Gravity Gaming
 7th-8th — 2015 Spring NA LCS
 7th-8th — 2015 Summer NA LCS

Cloud9
 3rd — 2016 NA LCS Spring Split	
 5-6th —2016 NA LCS Spring Playoffs
 3rd — 2016 NA LCS Summer regular season
 2nd — 2016 NA LCS Summer playoffs

References

Team Curse players
Curse Academy players
People from San Diego
Gravity Gaming players
Cloud9 (esports) players
League of Legends support players
Living people
Place of birth missing (living people)
1996 births